is a Japanese basketball coach and former player. He is currently the U15 coach of the Shiga Lakestars in the Japanese B.League.

Early life
Nema was born in Okinawa, Japan, in 1979. He attended Chatan Senior High School and later Hosei University.

Playing career
Nema played professionally for six seasons in the JBL Super League and the bj league from 2002 to 2006.

Coaching career
After his playing career came to an end, Nema got into coaching in 2008. He served as an interim coach for the Toyama Grouses after head coach Masato Fukushima was fired on 28 November 2008 and until the hiring of former Japan national team center Takatoshi Ishibashi on 9 December 2008. In 2015, he was hired as the head coach of the Gunma Crane Thunders.

Head coaching record

|- 
| style="text-align:left;"|Shiga Lakestars
| style="text-align:left;"|2011
| 16||11||5|||| style="text-align:center;"|4th in Western|||5||2||3||
| style="text-align:center;"|Lost in 2nd round
|- 
| style="text-align:left;"|Gunma Crane Thunders
| style="text-align:left;"|2015-16
| 52||22||30|||| style="text-align:center;"|9th in Eastern|||-||-||-||
| style="text-align:center;"|-
|-

References

External links
Profile at Eurobasket.com

1979 births
Living people
Akita Isuzu/Isuzu Motors Lynx/Giga Cats players
Gunma Crane Thunders coaches
Hiroshima Dragonflies coaches
Japanese basketball coaches
Rizing Zephyr Fukuoka players

Shiga Lakes coaches
Toyama Grouses coaches
Toyama Grouses players